Heteropsis simonsii, the pale bush brown, is a butterfly in the family Nymphalidae. It is found in southern and western Tanzania, the Democratic Republic of the Congo, Zambia, Malawi, Mozambique, Zimbabwe, Namibia, Botswana and South Africa (from Limpopo to the extreme north). The habitat consists of savanna, where it is found on grassy valley slopes, often near streams and rivers.

Both sexes are attracted to fermenting fruit. Adults are on wing year round. There are distinct seasonal forms. Adults of the wet-season form are on wing from November to April, while the dry-season form is on wing from May to October. Intermediate individuals may be observed in April and May.

References

Elymniini
Butterflies described in 1877
Butterflies of Africa
Taxa named by Arthur Gardiner Butler